The Slovak National Zoological Garden is a  zoo in the town of Bojnice, Slovakia. It is the oldest and most visited of Slovak zoos, being established in 1955. The zoo received more than 400,000 visitors in the year 2018.

, it presents over 360 different species, with a total of over 2700 specimens. Its primary attractions include the African elephant and Carpathian lynx. It is the only zoo in Slovakia with species such as the agile wallaby, Hamlyn's monkey, African palm civet, red-fan parrot and more.

The Bojnice Zoo is managed by the ministry of environment of the Slovak Republic.

History 
Opened on 1 April 1955, it is the first zoo to ever open in Slovakia. Initially called the Zoological Garden of the Nitra Region, administration of the zoo was later transferred to the ministry of environment in 1998. Only much later, in 2017, was the zoo named the Slovak National Zoological Garden.

Associations 
The Bojnice Zoo is a member of the International Union for Conservation of Nature (IUCN),the World Association of Zoos and Aquariums (WAZA), the European Association of Zoos and Aquaria (EAZA), the Union of Czech and Slovak Zoological Gardens (UCSZOO), the International Zoo Educators Association (IZA), the Species360 organization, the EUROLYNX organization, the West African Primate Conservation Action organization and the European Elephant Keeper and Manager Association.

Collection 

The Bojnice Zoo is home to the largest collection of animals of any Slovak zoo, many of which are also only showcased there. This includes, but is not limited to, the African elephant and bongo antelope.

The zoo also offers patrons the option to symbolic 'adopt' any of their animals for a fee, which supports the zoo financially.

Notes

External links

 

Zoos in Slovakia
Buildings and structures in Trenčín Region
Tourist attractions in Trenčín Region
Zoos established in 1955
1955 establishments in Czechoslovakia